There are more than 130 places of worship in the district of Chichester in the English county of West Sussex. Various Christian denominations are served, and there is also a large Buddhist monastery in Chithurst, one of the small villages which make up the largely rural area. The ancient city of Chichester, founded in Roman times and always the most populous settlement in the district, has been a centre of Christian worship since 1075, when its cathedral was built. However, nearby Selsey had its own cathedral 400 years earlier: Saint Wilfrid established an episcopal see there and used it as a base from which to convert Sussex to Christianity. Coastal erosion forced the bishopric to move inland to Chichester, and it has been the centre of the Anglican Diocese of Chichester ever since.

The majority of the district's residents identify themselves as Christian, and most villages have churches. These include tiny villages, such as Coates (whose church has been described as "enchanting and toy-like"), Didling (whose church remains oil-lit) and the Mardens, four scattered farming communities. Churches that are still in use for public worship can also be found in the grounds of private country estates, as at Burton Park and Stansted Park. The most numerous churches are Anglican churches serving the Church of England, the country's Established Church, though many other denominations are represented. Roman Catholicism, historically strong in West Sussex, has several churches for its adherents; Evangelical and Free Churches are found in the main settlements and in small villages; Methodists, Baptists and members of the United Reformed Church each have several churches; and smaller denominations such as the Assemblies of God, Christian Scientists, Jehovah's Witnesses, Quakers and Latter-day Saints (Mormons) have places of worship in the city of Chichester.

English Heritage has awarded listed status to 84 current church buildings in the district. A building is defined as "listed" when it is placed on a statutory register of buildings of "special architectural or historic interest" in accordance with the Planning (Listed Buildings and Conservation Areas) Act 1990. The Department for Culture, Media and Sport, a Government department, is responsible for this; English Heritage, a non-departmental public body, acts as an agency of the department to administer the process and advise the department on relevant issues. There are three grades of listing status: Grade I, the highest, is defined as being of "exceptional interest"; Grade II* is used for "particularly important buildings of more than special interest"; and Grade II, the lowest, is used for buildings of "special interest". , there were 80 buildings with Grade I status, 114 with Grade II* status and 3,057 with Grade II status in the district.

Overview of the district and its places of worship

Clockwise from the south, it has a coastline on the English Channel, then is bordered by the borough of Havant and the district of East Hampshire in the county of Hampshire; the borough of Waverley in the county of Surrey; and the districts of Horsham and Arun in West Sussex. The estimated population in 2009 was 112,600. The district's largest centre of population is the city of Chichester, with 23,731 residents at the time of the 2001 Census. Otherwise, small towns, villages and hamlets characterise the area; the civil parishes of Midhurst (4,889 residents), Petworth (2,775), Selsey (9,875) and Southbourne (6,001) are the next most populous places.

There are many ancient churches serving followers of the Church of England, the country's state religion.  At Bosham, the church has 8th-century origins, and many churches in the Manhood Peninsula area around Selsey reflect its historic importance as the base from which St Wilfrid evangelised the Kingdom of the South Saxons, as Sussex was historically known.  Many were built to a large scale—such as the former priory churches at Boxgrove and Easebourne, now reduced in size—but the remote downland villages that characterise the area often have tiny, simple churches that have seen little alteration since the 11th or 12th century.  Single-cell (nave and chancel in one room) or two-cell (nave and chancel separated by a chancel arch, with no aisles) layouts are common: Didling, East Marden, North Marden (with its rare apsidal end) and Terwick are examples.

Demolition of ancient churches in favour of new buildings was uncommon in this part of Sussex, but this happened at Duncton (at the request of a local nobleman) and at Hunston, where the medieval building was ruinous.  More common was the restoration and reconstruction of buildings during the Victorian era, sometimes drastically. Bignor, Eartham, Fernhurst, Fishbourne and Graffham are among the villages whose churches were transformed in the mid- to late 19th century.  Gordon Macdonald Hills, who conducted "particularly damaging restorations" at more than 30 Sussex churches, was active at several places in Chichester district, including Birdham, East Lavant, Westhampnett and West Itchenor.

More churchbuilding took place in the 19th century in the growing city of Chichester (the expansive St Paul's and several others now closed) and in large parishes which had a single parish church but several centres of population.  Residents of Plaistow and Loxwood no longer had to worship at Kirdford or Wisborough Green after churches were built in 1851 and 1900 respectively; Camelsdale gained a chapel of ease to Fernhurst in 1906; and Southbourne parish was carved out of Westbourne in 1878 after a church was built in the village two years earlier.  Mission halls and chapels of ease continued to be provided throughout the 20th century to meet population growth: brick-built church halls which could also be used for worship were put up near Bosham and Nutbourne railway stations (the latter replaced an older mission hall in nearby Hambrook), and a similar building was erected for residents of the Summersdale area of Chichester in the 1930s.  Woodmancote in Westbourne parish is served by a prefabricated tin tabernacle of a type that is now rare in England, and in Graffham village centre is a hall that is used for some Sunday evening services by the clergy of the parish church.

Roman Catholicism was historically stronger in West Sussex than in East Sussex, supported by wealthy landowners such as the Biddulph family of Duncton (who maintained a Mass Centre at their house, Burton Park, from the 17th century) and Charles Willcock Dawes of Petworth, who left £15,000 (£ in  pounds)) for a church to be built there in his memory in 1896.  Chichester had one by 1855 and Midhurst by 1869; both have been replaced by large postwar buildings of bold modern design.  St Richard of Chichester's Church in Chichester city controls two churches in nearby Bosham and East Wittering.

In contrast, Protestant Nonconformism in its various forms has fewer adherents than are found in the east of the county, and many Methodist, Baptist and other chapels have been closed.  The sale of several chapels in Chichester city enabled Methodists and United Reformed Church adherents to join forces and open a small red-brick church together in 1982; and Baptist worship in the city has a continuous history going back more than 300 years, now maintained in a postwar building in the suburbs.  Strict Baptists, whose chapels are much more prevalent in East Sussex, have a 200-year-old place of worship in the city, and the present Baptist church at Westbourne is the successor to an old chapel serving that sect.

The reuse of old chapels by new congregations is common: former Congregational chapels at East Dean and Kirdford are now in use by Evangelical groups, as is the 18th-century Zoar Strict Baptist Chapel at Wisborough Green and the former Society of Dependants' (Cokelers') meeting room in Loxwood, the historic centre of that tiny sect.  The former chapel of Graylingwell Hospital in Chichester stood empty until 2010, when a newly formed Anglican church moved in.  At Chithurst, an old mansion was converted into the Cittaviveka Buddhist Monastery.

Religious affiliation
According to the United Kingdom Census 2001, 106,450 people lived in Chichester district.  Of these, 77.28% identified themselves as Christian, 0.29% were Buddhist, 0.26% were Muslim, 0.17% were Jewish, 0.09% were Hindu, 0.02% were Sikh, 0.46% followed another religion, 14.24% claimed no religious affiliation and 7.2% did not state their religion.  The proportion of Christians was much higher than the 71.74% in England as a whole, other religions not listed in the Census were also followed by more people than average, and the proportion of Buddhists was slightly higher than in England overall (0.29% against 0.28%).  The proportion of people with no religious affiliation was lower than the national figure of 14.59%, and adherents of Islam, Hinduism, Judaism and Sikhism were much less prevalent in the district than in England overall: in 2001, 3.1% of people in England were Muslim, 1.11% were Hindu, 0.67% were Sikh and 0.52% were Jewish.

Administration

Anglican churches
All Anglican churches in the district are part of the Diocese of Chichester, whose cathedral is in  Chichester city.  Three Archdeaconries make up the next highest level of administration; churches in Chichester district are in either the Chichester Archdeaconry or the Horsham Archdeaconry.

The Chichester archdeaconry is divided into five rural deaneries.  The church at Eartham is in the Arundel and Bognor Deanery; those at Apuldram, Birdham, Boxgrove, Donnington, Earnley, East Lavant, East Wittering, Fishbourne, Hunston, Mid Lavant, North Mundham, Oving, Selsey, Sidlesham, Tangmere, West Itchenor, West Wittering and Westhampnett are in the Chichester Deanery.  The four churches in Chichester city—St George's, St Pancras', St Paul's and St Wilfrid's—are also in this deanery, but the Cathedral is part of its own extra-parochial area.

Horsham archdeaconry has eight rural deaneries.  Bepton, Camelsdale, Chithurst, Cocking, Didling, Easebourne, Elsted, Fernhurst, Hammer, Heyshott, Iping, Linch (Woodmansgreen), Linchmere, Lodsworth, Midhurst, Milland, Rogate, Selham, South Harting, Stedham, Terwick, Trotton and Woolbeding churches are part of the Midhurst Deanery.  Petworth Deanery covers the churches at Barlavington, Bignor, Burton Park, Bury, Coates, Duncton, Ebernoe, Egdean, Fittleworth, Graffham, Kirdford, Lurgashall, Northchapel, Petworth, Plaistow, Stopham, Sutton, Tillington, Upwaltham, Wisborough Green and Woolavington.  The two churches at Bosham (Holy Trinity and the St Nicholas' Church Hall at Broadbridge), and those at Chidham, Compton, East Dean, East Marden, Forestside, Funtington, North Marden, Nutbourne, Racton, Sennicotts, Singleton, Southbourne, Stansted, Stoughton, Up Marden, Westbourne, West Dean, West Stoke, West Thorney and Woodmancote, are covered by the Westbourne Deanery.

Roman Catholic churches
The Roman Catholic Diocese of Arundel and Brighton, whose cathedral is at Arundel, administers the District of Chichester's Roman Catholic churches.  All seven—at Bosham, Chichester, Duncton, East Wittering, Midhurst, Petworth and Selsey—are in the Cathedral Deanery, one of 13 deaneries in the diocese.  Selsey, Bosham and East Wittering churches are served by priests from Chichester, and Duncton's is served from Petworth.

Other denominations
The Southern Synod, one of 13 synods of the United Reformed Church in the United Kingdom, administers Chichester district's three United Reformed churches, at Chichester, East Wittering and Petworth.  Since September 2007, they have also been part of the South West Sussex United Area—an ecumenical partnership with the Methodist Church.  There are ten churches in this group: four United Reformed, five Methodist, and Christ Church at Chichester, which serves both denominations.  Selsey Methodist Church is also in the United Area; the district's other Methodist church, at Midhurst, is part of the seven-church Petersfield, Liphook & Haslemere Circuit, one of 24 circuits in the Southampton District.

Chichester Baptist Church is administratively part of the West Sussex Network of the South Eastern Baptist Association.  Westbourne Baptist Church, on the Hampshire border, comes under the Southern Counties Baptist Association.

The Tustin Memorial Chapel at Kirdford, East Dean Free Church, Milland Evangelical Church, Southbourne Free Church and the East Beach Evangelical Church at Selsey are members of Affinity (formerly the British Evangelical Council), a network of conservative Evangelical congregations throughout Great Britain.  3 Counties Vineyard (formerly Three Counties Church) at Hammer is a member of the Vineyard Churches UK and Ireland body, which belongs to the Association of Vineyard Churches.

Harting Congregational Church is part of the Congregational Federation, an association of independent Congregational churches in Great Britain.  The federation came into existence in 1972 when the Congregational Church in England and Wales merged with several other denominations to form the United Reformed Church.  Certain congregations wanted to remain independent of this, and instead joined the Congregational Federation.  , there were 235 churches in the Federation.

Current places of worship

See also
Grade I listed buildings in West Sussex
List of former places of worship in Chichester (district)

Notes

References

Bibliography

Chichester (district)
Chichester (district)
Chichester District